Cécile Alice Fromont is a Martiniquais-born American art historian and educator. Fromont is currently Professor of African and South Atlantic Art at Yale University.

Career
Born in Martinique, Fromont initially received a degree from Sciences Po in International Relations in 2002. She then continued on to Harvard University to receive degrees in Art History: a Master of Arts in 2004 and a Doctor of Philosophy in 2008. She wrote a doctoral dissertation under Suzanne Blier and Thomas B. F. Cummins titled "Under the Sign of the Cross in the Kingdom of Kongo: Shaping Images and Molding Faith in Early Modern Central Africa."

Upon graduating, Fromont began teaching at the University of Michigan as Assistant Professor of Art History in 2008. Two years later, she transferred to the University of Chicago. In 2017, Fromont was promoted to Associate Professor. In the following year, she was hired by Yale University, and also became a Fellow of the American Academy in Rome.

Fromont is a specialist in the visual, material, and religious culture of the Portuguese-speaking Atlantic world during the early modern period.

See also
List of Harvard University people
List of fellows of the American Academy in Rome (2011–present)
List of University of Chicago faculty
List of University of Michigan faculty and staff

References

External links
Official website
Yale University profile

Year of birth missing (living people)
Living people
American art historians
Harvard Graduate School of Arts and Sciences alumni
Historians of Africa
Historians of African art
Martiniquais emigrants to the United States
Sciences Po alumni
University of Chicago faculty
University of Michigan faculty
Women art historians
Yale University faculty